Imidazenil is an experimental anxiolytic drug which is derived from the benzodiazepine family, and is most closely related to other imidazobenzodiazepines such as midazolam, flumazenil, and bretazenil.

Imidazenil is a highly potent benzodiazepine receptor partial agonist with an unusual profile of effects, producing some of the effects associated with normal benzodiazepines such as anticonvulsant and anxiolytic effects, yet without any notable sedative or amnestic effects. In fact, imidazenil blocks the sedative effects of diazepam, yet without lowering the convulsion threshold, and so potentially could be a more flexible antidote than the antagonist flumazenil which is commonly used to treat benzodiazepine overdose at present.

Imidazenil has not yet been developed commercially for use in humans, however it has been suggested as a safe and effective treatment for anxiety, a potent yet non-sedating anticonvulsant which might be particularly useful in the treatment of poisoning with organophosphate nerve agents, and as a novel treatment for schizophrenia.

See also 
 Flumazenil
 Bretazenil
 GL-II-73
 Midazolam

References 

Carboxamides
Bromoarenes
Fluoroarenes
GABAA receptor positive allosteric modulators
Imidazobenzodiazepines